The 2014–15 Wisconsin Badgers men's basketball team represented the University of Wisconsin–Madison in the 2014–15 NCAA Division I men's basketball season. This was Bo Ryan's 14th and final full season as head coach at Wisconsin. The team played their home games at the Kohl Center in Madison, Wisconsin and were members of the Big Ten Conference.They finished the season 36–4, 16–2 in Big Ten play to win the Big Ten regular season championship. They defeated Michigan, Purdue, and Michigan State to win the Big Ten tournament and earn an automatic bid to the NCAA tournament. This marked the Badgers' 17th straight trip to the Tournament. In the Tournament, they defeated Coastal Carolina and Oregon to advance to their second straight Sweet Sixteen. They defeated North Carolina and Arizona to reach the school's fourth overall and second consecutive Final Four. By upsetting unbeaten Kentucky 71–64 in the Final Four in Indianapolis, the Badgers moved on to play Duke in the National Championship Game, going for their first title in 74 years. However, Wisconsin lost the game 68–63.

Previous season
The Badgers finished the 2013–14 season 30–8, 12–6 in Big Ten play to finish in a tie for a second place. They lost in the semifinals in the Big Ten tournament to Michigan State. They received at-large bid to the NCAA tournament as a No. 2 seed in the West region. They defeated American and Oregon to advance to the Sweet Sixteen. They defeated Baylor and Arizona to advance to the Final Four. However, they were eliminated by Kentucky in the Final Four.

Departures

2014 Commitments

Awards
All-Big Ten by Media
 Frank Kaminsky - Player of the Year & 1st team (both unanimous)
 Sam Dekker - 2nd team
 Nigel Hayes - 3rd team

All-Big Ten by Coaches
 Bo Ryan - Coach of the Year
 Frank Kaminsky - Player of the Year & 1st team (unanimous)
 Sam Dekker - 2nd team
 Nigel Hayes - 3rd team
 Josh Gasser - All-Defensive team

Roster

Schedule and results
Source

|-
!colspan=12 style="background:#cc1122; color:#ffffff;"| Exhibition

|-
!colspan=12 style="background:#cc1122; color:#ffffff;"| Non-conference regular season

|-
!colspan=12 style="background:#cc1122; color:#ffffff;"| Big Ten regular season

|-
!colspan=12 style="background:#cc1122; color:#ffffff;"|Big Ten tournament

|-
!colspan=12 style="background:#cc1122; color:#ffffff;"|NCAA tournament

Rankings

Player statistics

As of April 7, 2015

		        MINUTES    |--TOTAL--|   |--3-PTS--| |-F-THROWS-| |---REBOUNDS---|                 |-SCORING-| 
## Player           GP GS Tot  Avg  FG  FGA  Pct  3FG 3FA Pct FT FTA  Pct  Off Def Tot Avg PF FO  A  TO Blk Stl Pts Avg
44 Kaminsky, Frank  39 39 1311 33.6 267 488 .547  42 101 .416 156 200 .780  58 262 320 8.2 65  0 103  63 57 33 732 18.8
15 Dekker, Sam      40 40 1239 31.0 213 406 .525  50 151 .331  80 113 .708  77 143 220 5.5 42  0  49  36 18 21 556 13.9
10 Hayes, Nigel     40 40 1318 33.0 166 334 .497  40 101 .396 125 168 .744  85 162 247 6.2 76  1  79  51 16 34 497 12.4
24 Koenig, Bronson  40 24 1152 28.8 115 278 .414  62 153 .405  56  69 .812  19  51  70 1.8 64  2  98  33  8  9 348  8.7
12 Jackson, Traevon 21 17  506 24.1  60 139 .432  11  39 .282  40  47 .851   4  31  35 1.7 27  0  54  32  3 19 171  8.1
21 Gasser, Josh     40 40 1320 33.0  77 174 .443  49 126 .389  62  75 .827  29 110 139 3.5 90  1  70  21  8 30 265  6.6
13 Dukan, Duje      38  0  605 15.9  60 155 .387  29  91 .319  31  46 .674  28  70  98 2.6 48  0  24  25  3  8 180  4.7
03 Showalter, Zak   35  0  266  7.6  23  53 .334   2  14 .143  24  27 .889  18  27  45 1.3 38  0  16   5  4 10  72  2.1
30 Brown, Vitto     34  0  214  6.3  26  59 .441   0   0 .000  10  17 .588  12  31  43 1.3 38  0   7  15  8  8  62  1.8
35 Dearring, Riley  15  0   39  2.6   4  10 .400   3   7 .429   0   1 .000   0   4   4 0.3  5  0   1   6  0  1  11  0.7
05 Moesch, Aaron    14  0   28  2.0   2   7 .286   0   1 .000   0   2 .000   2   4   6 0.4  4  0   3   2  1  0   4  0.3
04 Ferris, Matt      9  0   17  1.9   1   3 .333   0   1 .000   0   0 .000   3   2   5 0.6  1  0   0   1  1  1   2  0.2
02 Smith, Jordan    14  0   35  2.5   0   9 .000   0   5 .000   0   0 .000   1   1   2 0.1  3  0   0   0  0  0   0  0.0
   Team                                                                      47  57 104       0       6
   Total..........  40  8050 1014 2115 .479 288 790 .365 584 765 .763 383 955 1338 33.5 501  4 504 296 127 174 2900 72.5
   Opponents......  40  8050  896 2092 .428 202 538 .375 333 469 .710 297 809 1106 27.7 723 10 359 378  84 163 2327 58.2

Season highs

Departures

Following the 2014-15 season seniors Frank Kaminsky, Josh Gasser, Traevon Jackson and Duje Dukan had all exhausted their NCAA eligibility. Following their NCAA championship defeat when Nigel Hayes was asked if he would declare for the NBA draft he said, "I'm nowhere near good enough to do anything but come back." On April 10 Sam Dekker chose to forgo his senior year and declare for the 2015 NBA Draft.

NBA draft selections

References

Wisconsin Badgers men's basketball seasons
Wisconsin
Wisconsin
NCAA Division I men's basketball tournament Final Four seasons
Badge
Badge
Big Ten men's basketball tournament championship seasons